Subhankar Das (born 1963) is an Indian poet, bookshop owner, actor and film producer.

Biography 
Das has written a total of twentyfour collections of poetry in Bangla. His most recent collection, 'Thieves of the Wind' (with Catfish McDaris appears in English.
In addition, his work has appeared in such publications as Blink-Ink

Poetry 
(in Bangla and in English)
 By the Banks of the Ajoy, Jaideb Vanishes into the Blue  Virgogray Press, 2011
(in English)
 Thieves of the Wind  (with Catfish McDaris)  Writing Knights Press, 2014
 66 lines On Your Soul (with Catfish McDaris & Kevin Ridgeway) Graffiti Kolkata India 2014
 Bukowski Smoked Bidis  Grandma Moses Press, 2015

Film 
 Birth of a Pillow

External links
 Blink-Ink, Quarterly publication of short fiction.

References

Indian male poets
1963 births
Living people